Çamlıpınaralanı is a village in Anamur district of Mersin Province, Turkey. It is situated in the southern slopes of the Taurus Mountains, on Turkish state highway , which runs from west to east in southern Turkey. It is close to Mediterranean coast. The population of Çamlıpınaralanı is 120 as of 2011.

References

Villages in Anamur District